Sonchus ustulatus, also known as a leituga, is a species of herb in the Asteraceae family. It has been found near or on islands owned by Portugal and Spain. It produces oxygen and grows to be around 0.2 meters.

Description 
The leituga is a perennial plant that either has no stem or a very short one. It does not have many floral heads and generally grows on a rocky shoreline. It is herbaceous.

Subspecies 
The leituga has 3 subspecies:

 Sonchus ustulatus imbricatus (instead of imbricatus it can be Lowe)
 Sonchus ustulatus maderensis 
 Sonchus ustulatus ustulatus

Found near 

 San Cristóbal de la Laguna  
 Distrito Anaga
 Funchal 
 Calheta 
 Sа̄o Vicente

References

Flora of Portugal
Flora of Spain
Plants described in 1831
Taxa named by Richard Thomas Lowe
ustulatus